Achtung, die Kurve!, also known as Curve Fever or simply Achtung, is a freeware, multiplayer snake game for MS-DOS. It supports from two-player up to eight-player gaming simultaneously. The game is a clone of another Czech game Červi (Worms) from 1993, differing in that the lines now have holes. Author is Filip Oščádal, aka Fred Brooker, from the Czech Republic who made this game, together with Kamil Doležal, for Commodore Amiga including music, sound effects and graphical background (worm speed depending on the picture). The game was written in Motorola 68000 assembly. The title is in German language.

Players leave a trail and try to make the opponent hit a wall or a trail first. The game is controlled by only two buttons, to turn left or right. In Achtung, die Kurve!, players can turn and travel in any direction, not limited to the four cardinal directions.

Gameplay
Each player spawns as a dot at a random spot on the playing field, move at a constant speed.  Each player has the ability to turn left or right, although the turning speed is limited such that sharp turns are not possible.  As the dot travels across the playing field, it draws a permanent, solid line in its wake, in the color of that player.  When the dot collides with any section of line or the boundary of the playing field, the player instantly loses, although the line remains in the playing field until the end of the game. The game becomes increasingly difficult as more of the playing field is blocked off by lines.  Other players may try to draw barriers to block the path of other players, forcing them into a collision.  However, as the lines are being drawn, gaps are occasionally being generated that can be used to escape a section of the map that has been blocked off.  The game is won when all but one of the players has collided.

In its original version, there are a total of 6 different lines. Up to six people can play at the same time.  All the lines are exactly the same, the color being the only thing setting the different lines apart. All the keys on the keyboard must be used to play this game as it takes a lot of skill and talent.

Tournaments
Six major Achtung tournaments have been held over the years. The first one, held in the summer of 2004 in Utrecht, Netherlands, was won by the Turkish Nationals. This tournament became a major success and paved the way for an even bigger tournament 3 years later. In October 2007, a second tournament was held in Jakarta, Indonesia- in part of the nation's gaming tournaments. In front of a crowd of around 400, Indonesia's Mighty Badgers defeated Sam's Club from Singapore in the final. The majority of the contenders were part of IASAS schools. In December 2006, third tournament took place at Faculty of Electrical Engineering and Computing in Zagreb, Croatia. It was significant because professors also joined the tournament. In 2012 the first Worldwide Tournament for Achtung, die Kurve! has been held  where paying players of the game could attend in an online tournament. Maikkon won this first online tournament. In Sweden there have been Achtung Die Kurve tournaments for a couple of years at a LAN party called Birdie. There are around 1000 people at Birdie each year and 2012 the winner won a graphic card by AMD. 
In January 2012 there was an worldcup tournament in Denmark with players from 13 countries where 2 of the 98 players were girls. In the final there were 5 different countries playing for the WC win: Dennis Zorko (Slovakia), Robert Feltcak (Poland), Pontus Larsson (Denmark), Anton Westman (Norway), Hampus Karlsson (Sweden) and Jimmie Klum (Sweden). The final was played in 6 games. All the players did play with every control for a fair result. In the end Jimmie Klum was a clear winner, Anton took the second and Hampus the third place. The prize was 1000 Euro and was collected from the money you had to pay to be in the tournament. The winner of the 2018 world cup was Johannes "Skillhannes" Girsch, also known as "the Austrian sniper".

Legacy 
The game's community created many remakes of Achtung die Kurve to be able to port the now unsupported game to modern platforms. For instance, the GitHub hosted Zatacka X remake was ported to the OpenPandora handheld in 2016. The game became a quite popular freeware download, for instance Softpedia counted 40,000 downloads of Zatacka. A shareware example of a similar game concept first released in 1998 is Vipers, which optionally includes AI-controlled opponents.

Game remakes include achtungkurve.com, an open Source HTML5 and JavaScript version of "Achtung, die Kurve!“, and  achtungkurve.net, an open Source remake by German duo Krito and the Stoker released in 2018. Additional remakes include Curve Fever, published 2011 by the Dutch authors Geert van den Burg and Robin Brouns, which ceased operations and was continued by Curve Fever Pro. Later remakes include Curve Wars  and Curve Crash.

References

External links 
 The original game files (archived)
 Original game running in an emulator in the browser

DOS games
DOS-only games
Video games developed in the Czech Republic
1995 video games
Multiplayer video games
Freeware games
Snake video games